Blue Valentine is the sixth studio album by singer and songwriter Tom Waits, released on September 5, 1978 on Asylum Records. It was recorded over the course of six sessions from July to August 1978 with producer Bones Howe. Rickie Lee Jones is pictured with Waits on the back cover.

Production
Blue Valentine was recorded in six sessions from July 24 to August 26, 1978 at Filmways/Heider Recording, Hollywood, California. Production was by Bones Howe, with second engineers Geoff Howe and Ralph Osborne. Disc mastering was by Terry Dunavan.

All the songs were written by Tom Waits apart from the opening track, "Somewhere", from the Leonard Bernstein and Stephen Sondheim musical West Side Story.

Critical reception 

Don Shewey of Rolling Stone found that Blue Valentine "is as solid a record as Waits has made", and that its best songs "rank high among the sentimental sagas that contain Tom Waits' strongest writing." Reviewing in Christgau's Record Guide: Rock Albums of the Seventies (1981), Robert Christgau wrote that "Waits keeps getting weirder and good for him. As sheer sendup, his 'Somewhere' beats Sid Vicious's 'My Way' his way. But I'm not always sure he understands his gift—these lyrics should be funnier. And 'Romeo Is Bleeding,' easily my favorite among his Chandleroid sagas of tragedy outside the law, is more effective on the jacket than when he underlines its emotional resonance in song. That's not weird at all."

Track listing
All tracks written by Tom Waits, except where noted.

Side one

Side two

Personnel
 Tom Waits - vocals, electric guitar (4–7, 9, 10), acoustic piano (3,8)
 Ray Crawford (4, 6, 10 [solo]), Roland Bautista (2, 4), Alvin "Shine" Robinson (7,9) - electric guitar
 Scott Edwards (7, 9), Jim Hughart (4, 6), Byron Miller (2, 5) - bass
 Da Willie Gonga (George Duke) - Yamaha Electric Grand piano (2, 3, 5) 
Harold Battiste - acoustic piano (7, 9)
 Charles Kynard - organ (4, 6)
 Herbert Hardesty (7, 9), Frank Vicari (4, 6) - tenor saxophone
 Rick Lawson (2, 5), Earl Palmer (7, 9), Chip White (4, 6) - drums
 Bobbye Hall Porter - congas on ("Romeo Is Bleeding") 
 Bob Alcivar - orchestra

Charts

References

Tom Waits albums
1978 albums
Asylum Records albums
Albums produced by Bones Howe